Jon Andrew McBride (born August 14, 1943), is a retired NASA astronaut and American naval officer.

Over the course of his career with the United States Navy, McBride served as an aviator, a fighter pilot, a test pilot, and an aeronautical engineer. He had achieved the rank of captain when he retired in 1989.

McBride was also an astronaut with NASA, a role in which he piloted STS-41-G, and would have been commander of STS-61-E had the mission not been cancelled in the wake of the Challenger disaster.

Early life, education and personal life
Jon McBride was born August 14, 1943, in Charleston, West Virginia, but considers Beckley, West Virginia, to be his hometown. He graduated from Woodrow Wilson High School, Beckley, West Virginia in 1960, then attended West Virginia University 1960–1964, and received a Bachelor of Science degree in Aeronautical Engineering from the U.S. Naval Postgraduate School in 1971. He did graduate work in Human Resource Management at Pepperdine University. At West Virginia, McBride became a member of the Phi Delta Theta fraternity.

McBride has three children: Richard M. (born March 3, 1962 - January 14, 1992)), Melissa L. (December 12, 1966), and Jon A. (born October 21, 1970). He has 8 grandchildren: Megan, Collin, Richard, Austin, Cadi, Bailey, Ryan (1999-2021), and Kendall.

Military career
McBride's naval service began in 1965 with flight training at Naval Air Station Pensacola, Florida. After being designated a Naval Aviator and receiving his wings in August 1966, he was assigned to Fighter Squadron 101 (VF-101) based at Naval Air Station Oceana, Virginia, for training in the F-4 Phantom II aircraft. He was subsequently assigned to Fighter Squadron 41 (VF-41) where he served 3 years as a fighter pilot and division officer. He has also served tours with VF-11 and VF-103. While deployed to Southeast Asia, McBride flew 64 combat missions during the Vietnam War.

He attended the U.S. Air Force Test Pilot School (Class 75A) at Edwards Air Force Base, California, prior to reporting to Air Test and Development Squadron Four (VX-4) at Naval Air Station Point Mugu, California, where he served as maintenance officer and Sidewinder project officer. He has flown over 40 different types of military and civilian aircraft and piloted the Navy "Spirit of '76" bicentennial-painted F-4J Phantom in various air shows during 1976, 1977, and 1978. He holds current Federal Aviation Administration (FAA) ratings which include civilian commercial pilot certificate (multi-engine), instrument, and glider; and he previously served as a Certified Flight Instructor (CFI).

He logged over 8,800 hours flying time—including 4,700 hours in jet aircraft and over 600 carrier landings.

NASA career

Selected as an astronaut candidate by NASA in January 1978, McBride became an astronaut in August 1979. His NASA assignments have included lead chase pilot for the maiden voyage of Space Shuttle Columbia, software verification in the Shuttle Avionics Integration Laboratory (SAIL), capsule communicator (CAPCOM) for STS-5, STS-6, and STS-7, Flight Data File (FDF) Manager, and orbital rendezvous procedures development.

McBride was pilot of STS-41-G, which launched from Kennedy Space Center, Florida, on October 5, 1984, aboard the Orbiter Challenger. This was the first crew of seven. During their eight-day mission, crew members deployed the Earth Radiation Budget Satellite, conducted scientific observations of the Earth with the OSTA-3 pallet and Large Format Camera, and demonstrated potential satellite refueling with an EVA and associated hydrazine transfer. Mission duration was 197 hours and concluded with a landing at Kennedy Space Center, Florida, on October 13, 1984.

McBride was scheduled to fly next in March 1986, as the commander of STS-61-E crew. This flight was one of several deferred by NASA in the wake of the Challenger accident in January 1986.
  
On July 30, 1987, McBride was assigned to NASA Headquarters to serve as Assistant Administrator for Congressional Relations, with responsibility for NASA's relationship with the United States Congress, and for providing coordination and direction to all Headquarters and Field Center communications with Congressional support organizations. He held this post from September 1987 through March 1989. In 1988, McBride was named to command the crew of the STS-35 (ASTRO-1) mission, scheduled for launch in March 1990, but chose to retire from NASA instead.

On September 23, 2011, the NASA Independent Verification and Validation Facility (IV&V) in Fairmont, West Virginia dedicated a NASA software laboratory to the West Virginia native Jon McBride. The laboratory's official name is the Jon McBride Software Testing and Research Laboratory, or JSTAR. JSTAR is NASA IV&V's environment for adaptable testing and simulation, designed to enhance tools and methods used to critically assess mission and safety critical software across NASA's missions.  The lab supports end to end testing on mission flight software through the application of analytical rigor to reduce the threat of software-related mission failure.

In September 2012, at the JSTAR one year celebration, NASA's IV&V Program launched the JSTAR website. The JSTAR website highlights all the work being performed under the JSTAR umbrella at NASA's IV&V facility.

Post-NASA career

Business career
In May 1989, McBride retired from NASA and the U.S. Navy, in order to pursue a business career. He was President and Chief Executive Officer of the Flying Eagle Corporation in Lewisburg, West Virginia, and President of the Constructors' Labor Council of West Virginia (heavy/highway construction contractors).

Political career
In 1996, he unsuccessfully vied for the Republican nomination for Governor of West Virginia, losing to Cecil H. Underwood.

In subsequent years, he left West Virginia to pursue business opportunities in Arizona.

Kennedy Space Center & Retirement
By 2008, McBride was retired and living near Cocoa, Florida. According to a short interview on September 20, 2017, during a "Meet an Astronaut" event, he was also actively working on improving the Space Shuttle Experience ride. He proposed to assist in the development of a landing sequence for the ride. McBride remained active supporting the "Lunch with an Astronaut" program at Kennedy Space Center until 2020 when he announced his retirement from duty at the visitor's center.

Organizations
Association of Naval Aviation
Veterans of Foreign Wars
American Legion
Society of Experimental Test Pilots
Phi Delta Theta
National Honor Society
West Virginia University Engineering Visiting Committee (Chairman, 1990–1992)
University System of West Virginia Board of Trustees (1992–1995)
Co-Chairman (with wife), American Cancer Society fund-raising (State of West Virginia) 1990
Executive Committee, Boy Scouts of America
President, Association of Space Explorers (USA) (1997–1998)
Executive Committee, Association of Space Explorers (Co-President, 1995–1996)
March of Dimes
American Red Cross Disaster Relief
Shawnee Hills Mental Health Group

Awards and honors
Legion of Merit
Defense Superior Service Medal
Air Medals (3)
Navy Commendation Medal with Combat V
Navy Unit Commendation
National Defense Service Medal
Vietnam Service Medal
NASA Space Flight Medal
West Virginia Secretary of State's "State Medallion" and appointed "West Virginia Ambassador of Good Will Among All Men" (1980)
Honorary Doctorate in Aerospace Engineering from Salem College (1984)
Honorary Doctorate of Science from West Virginia University (1985)
Honorary Doctorate of Science from University of Charleston (1987)
Honorary Doctorate of Science from West Virginia Institute of Technology (1987)
West Virginia Society's "Son-of-the-Year" (1988), City of Beckley
West Virginia "Hall of Fame"
Distinguished Alumni; West Virginia University (1988)
West Virginia's "Honorary Italian-American" (1988)
Kanawha County, West Virginia's "Famous Person Award" (1988)
West Virginia Broadcasters' "Man-of-the-Year" (1989)
City of Hope's "Spirit of Life Award Winner" (1991)
Daughters of the American Revolution "Medal of Honor" (1993)

See also

List of spaceflight records

References

External links

 
Astronautix biography of Jon McBride
Spacefacts biography of Jon McBride
McBride at Spaceacts 

1943 births
Living people
1984 in spaceflight
United States Navy astronauts
People from Charleston, West Virginia
Woodrow Wilson High School (Beckley, West Virginia) alumni
West Virginia University alumni
Naval Postgraduate School alumni
Pepperdine University alumni
American business executives
American aerospace engineers
U.S. Air Force Test Pilot School alumni
United States Navy captains
United States Naval Aviators
Aviators from West Virginia
Military personnel from Beckley, West Virginia
United States Navy personnel of the Vietnam War
Recipients of the Legion of Merit
Recipients of the Air Medal
Recipients of the Defense Superior Service Medal
American astronaut-politicians
West Virginia Republicans
NASA people
People from Cocoa, Florida
Commercial aviators
Space Shuttle program astronauts
University System of West Virginia trustees
Businesspeople from West Virginia